The Jurmala Young Pop Singer Competition,  has been held almost annually during 1986-1993 in the resort city of Jūrmala, Latvia. Each year the chairman of the jury was the initiator of the festival, Raimonds Pauls. Another founder and host (until 1992) was Yuri Nikolaev.

Since 1992: Jurmala Television Pop Music Festival

1986
Grand Prix: Rodrigo Fomins (Igo); songs: "Путь к свету", "Грибной дождь" and "Kā senā dziesmā"
1st prize: Narine Arutyunyan
2nd prize: Valentina Legkostupova; songs, "Берег счастья" and "Пускай метель"
3rd prize: Svetlana Medyanik & Ais Buluktaeva

1987
 Grand Prix: (was not awarded)
 1st prize: Kare Kauks
 2nd prize: Olga Rajecka & Uģis Roze
 3rd prize: Larisa Konoshchuk & Valery Karimov
 Spectators' Prize: Alla Perfilova; jazz-rock song by Natalya Maslova arranged by Leonid Yaroshevsky

1988
Grand Prix: Aleksandr Malinin; songs: "Коррида", "Напрасные слова", "Осторожно, двери закрываются"
1st prize: Erich Krieger
2nd prize: The competition this year had a political resonance when the Latvian pop-rock singer Zigfrīds Muktupāvels performed the patriotic song "Tautas laiks" ("People's Time") written by Imants Ziedonis.
3rd prize: Kastytis Kerbedis & Aziza Mukhamedova

1989
Grand Prix: Soso Pavliashvili
1st prize: Angelina Petrosova
2nd prize: Eugene Kulikov
3rd prize: Ivo Fomins
Spectators' Award: Ivo Fomins

1992
The competition was held July 21–25 in the Tennis Center "Lielupe". The organizers were Raimonds Pauls, Igor Nikolayev and Vadim Makarenko. This year it was announced as an International Television Festival and rules were changed: the number of contestants was limited to 15, the age was limited to 25, and the languages were limited to English and Latvian. Russian was excluded for political reasons due to the escalated conflict with Russia. For the latter reason Nikolayev was rejected as a host.

Grand Prix: Arina (Arina Borunova)
Third prize: Maxim Fadeev 

A 105' documentary Jurmala-92 was released.

See also
New Wave (competition)

References

Jūrmala
Soviet culture
Music competitions in Latvia
Singing competitions